Jordan Holt (born 17 March 2000) is an English professional footballer who plays as a midfielder for Annan Athletic in Scottish League Two

Club career

Carlisle United
Born in Carlisle, Holt joined Carlisle United at a young age and went onto make his first-team debut during their EFL Trophy tie against Fleetwood Town in November 2016, featuring for 28 minutes in the 4–2 victory.

Following his debut campaign, Holt agreed to join Northern Premier League side, Workington on loan in August 2017. Making his debut in that month in a 0–0 draw with Stafford Rangers, Holt went onto impress significantly, featuring thirty-five times for the Reds, scoring twice. Proceeding a six-month contract extension with Carlisle, Holt returned to Workington in August 2018 on a one-month loan.

Career statistics

References

External links

2000 births
Living people
English footballers
Footballers from Carlisle, Cumbria
Association football midfielders
Northern Premier League players
Carlisle United F.C. players
Workington A.F.C. players